Paul Saka is an American philosopher and Professor of Philosophy at University of Texas Rio Grande Valley.
He is known for his works on philosophy of language.

Books
How to Think about Meaning, Springer (2007)

References

21st-century American philosophers
Philosophy academics
Living people
Philosophers of language
University of Texas Rio Grande Valley people
Year of birth missing (living people)